Ingoldisthorpe is a village and civil parish in the north-west of the English county of Norfolk.

The villages name means 'Ingjaldr's outlying farmstead'.

For the purposes of local government, the parish falls within the district of King's Lynn and West Norfolk.

Notable residents
William Hoste, Royal Navy captain during the Napoleonic Wars

Notes

 http://kepn.nottingham.ac.uk/map/place/Norfolk/Ingoldsthorpe

External links

Information from Genuki Norfolk on Ingoldisthorpe.

 
Villages in Norfolk
Civil parishes in Norfolk
King's Lynn and West Norfolk